Arunee Bhanubandh na Ayudhya (born 15 September 1930), née Chuladakoson, is a Thai sailor. She competed in the Dragon event at the 1964 Summer Olympics. She was also married to Birabongse Bhanudej, a member of the Thai royal family, and was the first woman to represent Thailand at the Olympics.

References

External links
 

1930 births
Possibly living people
Thai female sailors (sport)
Olympic sailors of Thailand
Sailors at the 1964 Summer Olympics – Dragon
Place of birth missing (living people)
Asian Games medalists in sailing
Sailors at the 1970 Asian Games
Medalists at the 1970 Asian Games
Asian Games gold medalists for Thailand
Mom (consorts)
20th-century Chakri dynasty